Jeangu Macrooy (born November 6, 1993) is a Surinamese singer-songwriter. He was born in Paramaribo and has been living in the Netherlands in the eastern city Enschede in the region Twente since 2014. Macrooy's music is described as modern soul. His audience is in the Netherlands, Suriname, and increasingly in Belgium, France and Germany. He was due to represent host nation the Netherlands in the Eurovision Song Contest 2020 in Rotterdam with the song "Grow", but the contest was cancelled because of the COVID-19 pandemic. Instead, he represented the country in the 2021 contest with "Birth of a New Age".

Career

Early career 
In 2011, together with his twin brother Xillan, Macrooy formed the band Between Towers. Their first and only album, Stars on My Radio came out in 2013. After having studied at the Conservatory of Suriname in Paramaribo for two years, he moved to the Netherlands in 2014 to study songwriting at the ArtEZ Conservatory in Enschede.

2015–2019: Album releases and tours 
During a performance at the conservatory, Macrooy met music producer Perquisite and signed with his record label Unexpected Records shortly after in December 2015. Macrooy's debut EP Brave Enough appeared in April 2016, and his first single "Gold" was used in an advertisement for HBO. A year later, in April 2017, Macrooy released his first solo album, High on You. The album peaked at number 69 on the Dutch Albums Chart.

Both releases were followed by club tours in the Netherlands and performances as a supporting act at concerts abroad. He was the opening act for Curtis Harding and Ayo in Germany, and for Trombone Shorty in Belgium, France and Germany. He has also performed at some of the major music festivals of the Netherlands, including the North Sea Jazz Festival and Lowlands. In December 2017, Macrooy returned to Suriname for his first concert with his band in Paramaribo. His single "Dance with Me" was used as the theme song of the Dutch drama film Open Seas, which premiered in 2018.

Macrooy's second album, titled Horizon was released in February 2019. In the summer of 2019, he went on his first own headliner tour to three major cities in Germany: Cologne, Hamburg and Berlin. He also played at the internationally renowned Reeperbahn Festival in Hamburg.

His song "High on You" has gained great success in Suriname topping the Nationale Top 40 Suriname.

2020–present: Eurovision Song Contest 

On January 10, 2020, it was announced that Macrooy would represent the Netherlands in the Eurovision Song Contest 2020 in Rotterdam. After the show's cancellation due to the COVID-19 pandemic, it was announced that he would represent the country once again in the Eurovision Song Contest 2021. Jeangu is the third Dutch Eurovision act with Surinamese origins, as Humphrey Campbell (Eurovision Song Contest 1992) and Ruth Jacott (Eurovision Song Contest 1993) were also both born in Suriname before moving to the Netherlands.

On March 4, 2021, Macrooy's 2021 entry "Birth of a New Age" was released. The song was the first ever Eurovision entry to feature lyrics in Sranan Tongo. As Netherlands was the host country of the 2021 contest, Jeangu was automatically qualified for the final, where he placed 23rd out of 26 participants, receiving 11 points.

Television appearances

De Wereld Draait Door 

Macrooy has been a regular guest on the Dutch talkshow De Wereld Draait Door (DWDD). Besides performing his own music, he has paid tributes to other artists including Stevie Wonder, George Michael, and the Blue Diamonds. He also performed Bob Dylan's "The Times They Are a-Changin'" in a special retrospective broadcast of the show. Throughout the show's 2018–2019 season, Macrooy sang several songs by Paul Simon and Elton John, who had announced their farewell tours earlier in 2018.

The Passion 
On 28 March 2018, Macrooy was part of the Dutch national TV production The Passion, in which he took on the role of Judas, alongside  (Jesus), Brainpower (Saint Peter), Glennis Grace (Mary), and Arjan Ederveen (Pontius Pilate). The broadcast, which took place in Amsterdam-Zuidoost that year, attracted 3.5 million viewers.

De Nationale 2021 Test 

Due to the COVID-19 pandemic, the show was filmed with a virtual audience.

Personal life
Macrooy has a twin brother, Xillan Macrooy, who is also a singer and one of the backing vocalists in Jeangu Macrooy's band. The two have also collaborated on the song "Second Hand Lover" from Macrooy's album Horizon.

Jeangu has spoken about the importance of being an openly gay role model for young Surinamese people, a country where gay culture is often considered a taboo subject.

Discography

Studio albums

Live albums

Extended plays

Other albums
Stars on My Radio (2013) (album credited to Between Towers)

Singles

Awards and nominations

Notes

References

External links 

1993 births
Living people
People from Paramaribo
Surinamese composers
21st-century Surinamese male singers
Surinamese expatriates in the Netherlands
Eurovision Song Contest entrants of 2020
Eurovision Song Contest entrants of 2021
Eurovision Song Contest entrants for the Netherlands
Gay musicians
Surinamese LGBT people
20th-century LGBT people
21st-century LGBT people